Local elections were held in Kosovo on 3 November 2013, with a second round on 1 December. These were the first elections which the Serbs of Northern Kosovo participated in since the Republic of Kosovo declared independence in 2008; polls were monitored by the OSCE. There were violent reactions in Serb-majority areas of northern Kosovo.

Results 1st round
The Democratic Party of Kosovo (PDK) won in Drenas, Kaçanik, Skënderaj and Shtime.
The Democratic League of Kosovo (LDK) candidates received the most votes in Fushë Kosovë/Kosovo Polje, Istog and Podujevo.

The Alliance for the Future of Kosovo (AAK) in coalition with Democratic League of Dardania (LDD) won in Deçan/Dečani.
The Turkish Democratic Party of Kosovo won in Mamusha.
The independent candidate Rufki Suma (supported by Vetëvendosje!) won in Hani i Elezit.
Serb Civic Initiative won in Leposavić, Zvečan, and Zubin Potok.
The rest of communes went into the second round.

Incidents in Northern Kosovo
In August 2013, members of the "Interim Assembly of the Autonomous Province of Kosovo-Metohija" voted on a statement that said the election would violate Serbian law. This statement was rejected by the governments of Kosovo and of Serbia. Since Kosovo declared independence in 2008, government in these Serb-majority municipalities in the north of Kosovo has been funded by Serbia, and they have been dominated by organised crime and paramilitaries.

In the predominantly Serb area of Northern Kosovo, local Serb hardliners campaigned for a boycott of the elections. Voter intimidation was reported. Right before the election day, on Saturday night, a group of people attacked and severely injured the G.I.Srpska candidate for northern Mitrovica Krstimir Pantić in front of his house in Koloshin street; he was taken to hospital. The entire political spectrum condemned the attack. Though the perpetrators were not found, Pantić pointed to the pro-boycott groups, who were not interested in official representation of Serbs within Kosovo.

On election day, there were incidents and clashes with police, after extremists raided several polling stations and spoiled votes. Staff were assaulted, ballot boxes smashed, and tear gas canisters set off. This disruption caused the elections to be annulled in three polls in northern Mitrovica, repeated on November 17. The government of Serbia had encouraged Serbs in North Kosovo to participate in the elections, but this violence undermined attempts to normalise relations between the two governments.
According to the OSCE the voter turnout was 22% in Leposavić, 22% in Zubin Potok and 11.21% in Zvečan.
Oliver Ivanović called for the results in the northern four municipalities to be annulled.
Following Foreign Minister Enver Hoxhaj declarations that "the mayors in the north should be of Serbian ethnicity", the Albanian opposition accused the government and DPK for having intentionally facilitated the defeat of Albanian candidates for the sake of stimulating the Serbian citizens in the north, despite their low voter turnout.

Partial repetition in Northern Mitrovica
The partial revoting in three polls of Northern Mitrovica on 17 November was quiet without any notable incident. The result reconfirmed G.I.Srpska had the plurality, pushing the municipality elections into the second round on 1 December.

Results 2nd round
The media reported a turnout of 41.5%, while the official statement after the closing of polls from the Central Election Commission chairwoman Valdete Daka gave a turnout of 39.87%.
New Kosovo Alliance (AKR) won in Gjakova (Đakovica) with Mimoza Kusari Lila, former Minister of Commerce, becoming the first female mayor in the history of the new country. The same New Kosovo Alliance (AKR) (supported by Democratic League of Kosovo) won in Mitrovica.
Democratic League of Kosovo (LDK) won in Gjilan, Lipjan, Peja, Suva Reka, Ferizaj, and Viti/Vitina.
Vetëvendosje! won in Prishtina, where LDK had previously ruled since ever.
Democratic Party of Kosovo (PDK) won in Dragash, Klina, Kamenica, Rahovec, Prizren, and Vushtrri.
Alliance for the Future of Kosovo (AAK) in coalition with Democratic League of Dardania (LDD) won in Obilić, and Junik.
Serb Civic Initiative won in Novo Brdo, Gracanica, Ranillug, Klokot, Partesh (result got suspended by the CEC due to irregularities and partial repetition established for two weeks later), and Northern Mitrovica.
Independent Liberal Party (SLS) won in Štrpce.
Civic Initiative for Malisevo led by former KLA leader and politician Fatmir Limaj, won in Malisheva.

Incidents during the Second Round
Incidents similar to Northern Mitrovica during the first round we reported in Partesh during the second round, where groups of persons entered the voting polls and destroyed the materials. The Central Election Commission reordered re-voting in three polls to be held in December 15, 2013, before finalizing the results for this municipality.

Other controversies sprang in Prishtina, where a video of Isa Mustafa's son trying to buy votes were registered and distributed to the media from a VV! activist.

Partial repetition in Partesh
The repetition took place in Pasjan village on December 15. 1304 voters (68.78%) participated. G.I.Srpska won over SLS with 52.4%.

Incidents in overall
The official statement from the Prosecution Office during the fourth press conference within December 1, stated that the office received material regarding 44 cases involving 81 persons. Out of these, 16 charges were pressed towards 21 persons. In addition, 8 persons were arrested during the same day for various offenses related to the election process.

Reactions
 EU: EU Special Representative in Kosovo Samuel Žbogar said the election was a success, even in Northern Kosovo. He said that there was a good voter turn-out in Northern Kosovo.
 Germany: German government spokesman Steffen Seibert condemned the violence and praised Kosovo and Serbia for the election.
Organization for Security and Co-operation in Europe: OSCE spokesman Nikola Gaon said that the attack on the electoral process and the OSCE staff cannot be tolerated and that the mission is expecting that the attackers will be found and convicted.
 The Kosovo government called the elections a historical step in integrating the north with the rest of Kosovo, and evaluated them as very positive.
 American Embassy in Pristina said that they were encouraged by the turnout and the ongoing elections in the north, nevertheless they would be following the reported irregularities and expected that all issues got resolved conforming to Kosovo legislation.
European Network of Election Monitoring Organizations (ENEMO), in its preliminary conclusions regarding the re-run in Northern Mitrovica, stated that the re-run of the 1st round of local elections in North Mitrovica was conducted efficiently and administered in a peaceful atmosphere in all Polling Centers, with occasional procedural shortcomings.

Results by municipality

Mitrovica District

Leposavić

In addition to being elected as mayor of Leposavić under the electoral system overseen by Prishtina, Dragan Jablanović was initially recognized by Belgrade as the leader of a parallel provisional authority. He became a founding member of the Serb List in 2014. He was removed as leader of the provisional authority the following year at his own request, amid the backdrop of serious divisions in the Serb List, and was replaced by Zoran Tomić. Jablanović continued to serve as Leposavić's elected mayor, and in 2017 he joined the Party of Kosovo Serbs. Jablanović's political affiliations in these years were the same as those of his son, Aleksandar Jablanović.

Mitrovica

North Mitrovica

Skenderaj

Vushtrri

Zubin Potok

Vulović subsequently joined the Serb List.

Zvečan

Janković subsequently joined the Serb List.

Oaths controversy in North Mitrovica, Pantić resignation and 3rd election
All candidates who won elections had to sign a swearing in and oath paper that contained symbols of the Republic of Kosovo. In Serbian areas, a piece of paper was taped over the symbols so that Serbs would sign them without incident. Krstimir Pantić, mayor-elect of North Mitrovica, took the paper off the symbols, declared he would never sign them and resigned. A new election for North Mitrovica was scheduled for February 23, 2014.
 Goran Rakić won the election on February 23. He campaigned that he would sign the oath.

Rakić subsequently joined the Serb List, becoming its leader in July 2017.

See also
 Government of Kosovo
 Brussels Agreement (2013)
 Municipalities of Kosovo

References

2013
2013 elections in Europe
November 2013 events in Europe
2013 in Kosovo